Herlander Fernandes Silva Coimbra (born June 16, 1968 in Luanda) is a retired Angolan basketball player.  A 6’7”, 172-pound forward, he played on Angola's 1992, 1996, and 2000 Olympic basketball teams.

Coimbra was involved in a confrontation with American player Charles Barkley during the 1992 Barcelona games.  Coimbra had hit Barkley while jockeying for position underneath the basket, and Barkley retaliated by elbowing Coimbra in the chest. Barkley later said, "Somebody hits me, I’m going to hit him back – even if it does look like he hasn’t eaten in a while."

Though Barkley drew criticism for his actions and words, Coimbra took everything with good humor and actually struck up a friendship with his American opponent.  Barkley later told reporters, "He came looking for me in 1996 in Atlanta to say hello. He said, ‘You made me a big star in my country.’ We’ve had a nice bond." Coimbra’s two-time Olympic teammate Angelo Victoriano also said, "Every time we go to the States, we meet Charles Barkley.  He’s very supportive of us."

References

External links
 

Basketball Reference Profile
AfricaBasket Profile

1968 births
Living people
Basketball players from Luanda
Angolan men's basketball players
1990 FIBA World Championship players
Olympic basketball players of Angola
Basketball players at the 1992 Summer Olympics
Basketball players at the 1996 Summer Olympics
Basketball players at the 2000 Summer Olympics
C.D. Primeiro de Agosto men's basketball players
Small forwards
1994 FIBA World Championship players